Lobogenesis varnicosa is a species of moth of the family Tortricidae. It is found in Argentina.

The length of the forewings is 6.5-7.2 mm. The forewings are dingy white with brownish overscaling and darker brown striae. The hindwings are dingy whitish with pale grey-brown overscaling and mottling.

References

Moths described in 2000
Euliini